Laurent Pichon (born 19 July 1986) is a French racing cyclist, who currently rides for UCI ProTeam . He was named in the start list for the 2015 Vuelta a España. In June 2017, he was named in the startlist for the Tour de France. He was the winner of the 2017 French Road Cycling Cup.

Major results

2009
 10th Overall Kreiz Breizh Elites
2010
 1st  Scratch race, National Track Championships
 1st Stage 7 Tour de Normandie
 2nd Route Adélie
 2nd Boucles de l'Aulne
 4th Val d'Ille Classic
 6th Overall Kreiz Breizh Elites
 8th Overall Paris–Corrèze
 8th Paris–Bourges
 10th Grand Prix de Plumelec-Morbihan
2011
 1st  Overall Kreiz Breizh Elites
 2nd Overall Circuit des Ardennes
1st Stage 3
 2nd Overall Four Days of Dunkirk
 4th Tour de Vendée
 5th Overall Boucles de la Mayenne
 5th Rund um den Finanzplatz Eschborn-Frankfurt
 8th Flèche d'Emeraude
 9th Route Adélie
 10th Paris–Troyes
2012
 1st  Overall Boucles de la Mayenne
 2nd Route Adélie
 2nd Boucles de l'Aulne
 5th Overall Circuit de Lorraine
 5th Paris–Tours
 6th Tour de Vendée
 8th Overall Four Days of Dunkirk
2013
 3rd Classic Loire Atlantique
 4th Tour de Vendée
 8th Val d'Ille Classic
 9th Route Adélie
 10th Paris–Camembert
2014
 3rd Paris–Camembert
 5th Tour de Vendée
 7th Grand Prix d'Ouverture La Marseillaise
2015
 3rd Boucles de l'Aulne
 9th Grand Prix Pino Cerami
2016
 4th Tro-Bro Léon
 9th Overall Tour de Wallonie
 Vuelta a España
Held  after Stage 2
Held  after Stage 2
2017
 1st Overall French Road Cycling Cup
 1st Route Adélie
 1st Classic Loire Atlantique
 1st Stage 1a Settimana Internazionale di Coppi e Bartali
 3rd Polynormande
 3rd Boucles de l'Aulne
 4th Tro-Bro Léon
 7th Paris–Camembert
 7th Grand Prix de Plumelec-Morbihan
 8th Grand Prix d'Isbergues
 9th Grand Prix de Fourmies
 10th Overall Four Days of Dunkirk
2018
 6th Overall Arctic Race of Norway
 10th Paris–Camembert
  Combativity award Stage 7 Tour de France
2019
 5th Overall Kreiz Breizh Elites
2020
 4th Grand Prix de la Ville de Lillers
2021
 4th Boucles de l'Aulne
2022
 7th Tro-Bro Léon
 8th Paris–Roubaix

Grand Tour general classification results timeline

References

External links
 
 

1986 births
Living people
French male cyclists
Sportspeople from Quimper
Cyclists from Brittany